Daniel Dujshebaev Dobichebaeva (born 4 December 1997) is a Spanish handball player for Industria Kielce and the Spanish national team.

His mother is of Russian descent, and his father, Talant Dujshebaev who is a former handball player and current coach, is of Kyrgyz descent. His brother Alex Dujshebaev is also a handball player.

References

External links

Living people
1997 births
Sportspeople from Santander, Spain
Spanish male handball players
Handball players from Cantabria
Liga ASOBAL players
BM Valladolid players
Spanish people of Kyrgyzstani descent
Spanish people of Russian descent
Expatriate handball players in Poland
Spanish expatriate sportspeople in Poland
Vive Kielce players
Spanish expatriate sportspeople in Slovenia
Competitors at the 2018 Mediterranean Games
Mediterranean Games bronze medalists for Spain
Mediterranean Games medalists in handball
21st-century Spanish people